Gutenburg is a village in the canton of Bern, Switzerland. On June 7, 2006, the independent municipality decided to merge into the municipality of Madiswil. The merger was completed on January 1, 2007.

References

External links

Restaurant Bad Gutenburg 

Villages in the canton of Bern
Former municipalities of the canton of Bern